"Valentine" is a song co-written and performed by American recording artist Jim Brickman, with a guest vocal from Martina McBride. It first appeared on his 1997 album Picture This, and later on McBride's album Evolution.

Chart performance
The song charted on the Billboard Hot 100 and Adult Contemporary charts in 1997, peaking at number 50 on the former and number 3 on the latter. Although it first appeared on the Hot Country Songs charts at that time, it was not officially released as a single to the country format until a year later. The song was the follow-up to her single "A Broken Wing," to which "Valentine" originally served as the b-side. Upon its official release, "Valentine" peaked at number 9.

Charts

Weekly charts

Year-end charts

References

1997 singles
Jim Brickman songs
Martina McBride songs
Male–female vocal duets
RCA Records Nashville singles
Songs written by Jim Brickman
Songs written by Jack Kugell
1997 songs
1990s ballads
Country ballads
Pop ballads